Gottfried T. Lindsten (June 27, 1887 – June 2, 1961) was the 29th Lieutenant Governor of Minnesota.

Gottfried T. Lindsten was born in Minneapolis, Minnesota. He had been employed as  a railroad conductor and later as an alderman and lobbyist. He became Lieutenant Governor under Governor Elmer Austin Benson serving from January 4, 1937 – January 2, 1939. He was an alternate delegate to Democratic National Convention from Minnesota in 1944. He died in 1961 in Minneapolis.

References

1887 births
1961 deaths
Politicians from Minneapolis
American people of Swedish descent
Lieutenant Governors of Minnesota
20th-century American politicians
Minnesota Democrats